George Balzer (September 1, 1915 - September 28, 2006) was an American screenwriter and television producer.

Biography
Balzer was born to a Roman Catholic family in Erie, Pennsylvania, and spent most of his career writing for Jack Benny.  He died, aged 91, in Van Nuys, California.

References

 Young, Jordan R. (1999) The Laugh Crafters: Comedy Writing in Radio & TV's Golden Age. Beverly Hills: Past Times Publishing

External links

 

1915 births
2006 deaths
20th-century American male writers
American comedy writers
American male screenwriters
American radio writers
American Roman Catholics
American television writers
American television producers
Emmy Award winners
American male television writers
Writers from Erie, Pennsylvania
20th-century American screenwriters